Caraparí is a small town in Bolivia. Its name is due to a kind of tree originating from these places, in 2009 it had an estimated population of 1461.

References

Populated places in Tarija Department